Mältan  is a village in Karlskrona Municipality, Blekinge County, southeastern Sweden. According to the 2005 census it had a population of 71 people.

Mältan contains a recycling station that is used by hundreds of people each day as of 2020.

References

Populated places in Karlskrona Municipality